Anthony Claude "Tony" Micale (born 22 November 1948) is an Australian rules football coach and former player. He is the current coach of the East Perth Football Club. Micale played for the South Fremantle and East Fremantle Football Clubs in the West Australian Football League (WAFL), and later took up coaching. He also occasionally works as a special comments radio commentator for football matches broadcast on 6PR.

Career

Micale coached  from 1997 to 1998, including the side's premiership win in 1998. He served as an assistant coach of the West Coast Eagles in the Australian Football League (AFL) from 2003–08, and was named as "AFL Assistant Coach of the Year" in 2007. He was dropped from the role at the end of the 2008 season. Micale was re-appointed coach of East Perth for the 2009 season, replacing Glen Bewick. In April 2011, Micale stepped down from his role as coach of East Perth after the death of his son, Josh, from a brain aneurysm, but returned the following week.

References

Living people
1948 births
Australian rules football commentators
Australian rules footballers from Perth, Western Australia
East Fremantle Football Club coaches
East Fremantle Football Club players
East Perth Football Club coaches
South Fremantle Football Club players
South Fremantle Football Club coaches